FC Buelach are a football team from  Switzerland who played in the 2L Inter Group 4 2008–2009, currently in the 2. Liga.

Current squad

Staff and board members

 Trainer : Roger Etter & Markus Ess
 Assistant Trainer : Daniel Bernauer
 Goalkeeper coach: Reto Lopefe
 Club doctor : Mario Schiavi
 Groundsman : Slavisa Simijonovic
 Honorary President : Heinz Lieb
 Honorary President : Edi Koller

External links
Official Website

Association football clubs established in 1917
Football clubs in Switzerland
FC Bulach
FC Bulach